Norfolk South may refer to:

 Norfolk South (Canadian electoral district), former Canadian federal electoral district, 1867–1904
 Norfolk South (provincial electoral district), former Ontario provincial electoral district, 1867–1926
 South Norfolk (UK Parliament constituency)